Kicked in the Head is a 1997 American comedy film directed by Matthew Harrison and written by Kevin Corrigan and Matthew Harrison. The film stars Kevin Corrigan, Linda Fiorentino, Michael Rapaport, Lili Taylor, James Woods and Burt Young. The film was released on September 26, 1997, by October Films.

Plot

Redmond is a young guy who can't find what to do with his life. When his uncle Sam gives him the bag to deliver to some uptown connection he fails to do so and it gets them in trouble with Jack, low-key criminal. After that tough guy Stretch wants Redmond to take part in his illegal beer business, but before Redmond gets involved, the business ends in a bad way. Redmond is also having affair with flight attendant Megan.

Cast 
 Kevin Corrigan as Redmond
 Linda Fiorentino as Megan
 Michael Rapaport as Stretch
 Lili Taylor as 'Happy'
 James Woods as Uncle Sam
 Burt Young as Jack
 Bianca Hunter as Pearl
 Olek Krupa as Borko

References

External links
 
 

1997 films
American comedy films
1997 comedy films
American independent films
1990s English-language films
1990s American films